Saint Severus may refer to:

People

Severus of Antioch or Saint Severus the Great (465–518), a Greek monk and theologian
Severus of Avranches (died c. 690), a French peasant who became Bishop of Avranches
Severus of Barcelona (died c. 304), a legendary Bishop of Barcelona
Severus of Naples (died 409), a bishop of Naples during the 4th and 5th centuries
Severus of Ravenna (c. 308–c. 348), bishop of Ravenna
Severus of Reims, bishop of Reims from 394 to 400
Saint Severus of Novempopulania (died 407), beheaded by Visigoths
Severus of Vienne (died c. 455), a missionary in France

Places
St. Severus (Gemünden), a collegiate foundation in Gemünden, Germany

See also
Severus (disambiguation)
San Severo (disambiguation)